The 1950 South Dakota State Jackrabbits football team was an American football team that represented South Dakota State University in the North Central Conference (NCC) during the 1950 college football season. In its fourth season under head coach Ralph Ginn, the team compiled a 9–0–1 record and outscored opponents by a total of 381 to 116.

Schedule

References

South Dakota State
South Dakota State Jackrabbits football seasons
North Central Conference football champion seasons
College football undefeated seasons
South Dakota State Jackrabbits football